Massimo Sarmi (born 4 August 1948 in Malcesine) is an Italian businessman. He was the chief executive officer of Poste italiane Spa from May 2002 to April 2014.

Career
Massimo Sarmi began his career as an engineer in the Italian Air Force.

In 1995 he became the managing director of the newly established TIM, a position that he left in 1998 and took the position of codirector for the parent company Telecom Italia.

In 2001 Siemens Italia appointed him CEO, a position he left in 2002 to become CEO of the Poste Italiane Group.

Since 2002 he has been a member of the Board of Administration of the Bocconi University in Milan.

In May 2009 he was elected for the second time to the board of Ipc, International Post Corporation, the association of the largest postal operators in the world.

Since June 2010 Massimo Sarmi is also chairman of the Global Cyber Security Center (Gc-Sec), the international study and research body for digital communication security established in Rome on the initiative of Poste Italiane.

Poste Italiane
Massimo Sarmi was appointed CEO of the Poste Italiane Group in May 2002 and has been reconfirmed three times (2005, 2008 and 2011).
At the head of the Group, Massimo Sarmi has developed a strategy for strengthening the post office network, technological innovation, expansion of the range of services and entry into new business sectors, obtaining significant results on the financial level.
Poste Italiane, under the guidance of Massimo Sarmi, has established relationships with important national and international players, such as UPS, Finmeccanica, Russian Post, Microsoft, IBM, HP, Cisco, Vodafone and Ferrovie dello Stato.
 
Poste Italiane, under the leadership of Massimo Sarmi, has been placed in the list of the "World's Most Admired Companies" drawn up by the US magazine Fortune, for five years. In 2011 Poste Italiane has been placed in fifth position in the list of the leading global operators in the delivery sector.

From July 2011 to April 2015 he is the chairman of the board of directors of Banca del Mezzogiorno – MedioCredito Centrale, a subsidiary of Poste italiane.

Milano Serravalle – Milano Tangenziali
On 6 October 2014 Sarmi became the CEO of Milano Serravalle – Milano Tangenziali.

See also
Poste Italiane
PosteMobile

Notes

External links
 Poste Italiane Website

1948 births
Living people
Italian businesspeople
People from the Province of Verona